Nicolae Valeriu Ivan (28 August 1941 – 7 August 2018) was a Romanian football defender and manager.

Career
He played the whole match in the 6–1 victory against Siderurgistul Galați in the 1963 Cupa României final, helping Petrolul Ploiești win the first Cupa României in the club's history. Ivan was part of Universitatea Craiova's team that won the 1973–74 Divizia A, which was the first trophy in the club's history. After he ended his playing career he worked as a manager, being Constantin Oțet's assistant at "U" Craiova from 1982 until 1984, a period in which the club won the 1982–83 Cupa României and reached the semi-finals of the 1982–83 UEFA Cup. Between 1994 and 1997 he was "U" Craiova's vice-president.

Honours
Petrolul Ploiești
Cupa României: 1962–63
Universitatea Craiova
Divizia A: 1973–74

References

1941 births
2018 deaths
Romanian footballers
Association football defenders
Liga I players
Liga II players
CSM Flacăra Moreni players
FC Petrolul Ploiești players
CS Universitatea Craiova players
Romanian football managers
Romanian sports executives and administrators
Footballers from Bucharest